Maurice Sleem (born in Kfarshima, Lebanon, on February 5, 1954) is a  Lebanese politician. He has been the Minister of National Defense since September 10, 2021 (the formation of the government of Prime Minister Najib Mikati). He is a Brigadier General in the Lebanese Armed Forces (retired).

During his 40-year career, he held key posts and staff assignments in Army operational Units. He also worked at the Lebanese Presidency for many years.

He retired from the Army in 2012.

Decorations and medals 

 Lebanese Order of Merit 3rd Grade.
 Lebanese Order of Merit 2nd Grade.
 Lebanese Order of Merit 1st Grade.
 National Order of the Cedar Knight Grade.
 National Order of the Cedar Officer Grade.
 National Order of the Cedar Commander Grade.
 War Order (4).
 Order of the “Dawn of the South”.
 Order of Battle Wounded / Purple Heart.
 Order of National Unity. 
 Military Valor Order. 
 Order of Fight against Terrorism.

References 

1954 births
Living people
Defense ministers of Lebanon
Lebanese politicians
Greek Orthodox Christians from Lebanon
Free Patriotic Movement politicians
Lebanese military personnel